This is a list of United States Army airfields.

Active

United States and Territories

Worldwide

Closed

United States and Territories

Worldwide

Lists by state
 Alabama World War II Army Airfields
 Alaska World War II Army Airfields
 California World War II Army Airfields
 Texas World War II Army Airfields

References
Footnotes

Citations

External links 
U.S. Army Aeronautical Services Agency: U.S. Army airfields and heliports 
GlobalSecurity.org: U.S. Army airfields and heliports 
 Freeman.com: Abandoned & Little-Known Airfields

 
United States Army airfields
 
Airfields